Desperadas 2 is a 2008 Filipino romantic comedy film directed by Joel C. Lamangan and the sequel to Desperadas (2007). The film stars Ogie Alcasid, Marian Rivera, Ruffa Gutierrez, and Iza Calzado.

Plot
The four sisters from Desperadas face new problems. The eldest daughter is having problems with her husband. The second was indicted by her friends in estafa cases involving money she loaned. The third, after divorcing her husband due to infidelity and homosexuality, is now a romance psychologist and counselor. The youngest still has problems with her future family-in-law. The problems get worse when their fifth sister (Ogie Alcasid), a leader in an African kingdom, arrives in the Philippines to meet her mother and sisters. She has the solutions for every problem they had, but they must meet her conditions.

Cast

Reception

Accolades
 2008, won Festival Prize for 'Best Makeup' at Metro Manila Film Festival for Noli Villalobos
 2009, nominated for Star Award as 'New Movie Actor of the Year' for Carl Guevara

References

External links
 

2008 films
2008 romantic comedy films
Filipino-language films
Films about sisters
Films directed by Joel Lamangan
Films shot in Metro Manila
Philippine romantic comedy films
Philippine sequel films
Regal Entertainment films
2000s Tagalog-language films